Tadeusz Pikus (born 1 September 1949 in Zabiele, Mońki County) is a Polish Roman Catholic prelate who was Bishop of Drohiczyn from 2014 to 2019. He was previously Auxiliary Bishop of Warsaw from 1999 to 2014,

Biography
He studied at the Academy of Catholic Theology in Warsaw and at the University of Navarre in Pamplona, Spain. He was ordained on 7 June 1981. For two years he served as vicar and catechist in the parish of Holy Family in Jaktorów.

Returning from Spain, he was a lecturer, Prefect, and then Vice-Rector at the Major Metropolitan Seminary of St. John the Baptist in Warsaw. He was also appointed minister of entrepreneurs and promoters of economic life in Warsaw and was the rector of the seminary church of the Immaculate Conception of the Blessed Virgin Mary in Białystok.

On 8 May 1999 he was consecrated Auxiliary Bishop of the Archdiocese of Warsaw. He continued to teach at the Cardinal Stefan Wyszyński University in Warsaw. On 13 October 2005 the Ministry of Education awarded him the Medal of the National Education Commission for outstanding contribution to education.

On 29 March 2014, Pope Francis named him bishop of Drohiczyn.

Pope Francis accepted his resignation on 17 June 2019.

Publications 
 Aleksander Mień, kapłan Kościoła prawosławnego – zamordowany, Warsaw 1997
 Rosja w objęciach ateizmu, Warsaw 1997
 Aksjologiczny wymiar religii w twórczości Aleksandra Mienia : studium analityczno-krytyczne, Warsaw 1998
 Katolik w Rosji, Warsaw 2003
 O władzy w Kościele, Warsaw 2003
 Etiologiczna demarkacja dialogu religijnego w Kościele Katolickim, Warsaw 2006

References

Polish Roman Catholic theologians
21st-century Roman Catholic bishops in Poland
1949 births
Living people
People from Mońki County
University of Navarra alumni